Sangeeta Kaur is a Grammy Award winning Vietnamese American classical/crossover, new age vocalist, composer, performing artist, and producer. In 2022, she received a Grammy Award for Best Classical Solo Vocal Album for Mythologies, making her the first Vietnamese-American singer to ever receive a Grammy for a vocal performance. She has performed at the Sydney Opera House and Lincoln Center, among others  and in 2021 made her debut television performance, "Sangeeta Kaur and Friends", with Jon Anderson of Yes and Jake Shimabukuro, among others on PBS's Front & Center music series. Kaur performed vocals on Stewart Copeland's and Ricky Kej's 2022 Grammy Award Winning album, Divine Tides.

She has won numerous awards including being inducted to the Independent Music Hall of Fame in 2020. Kaur and her husband, Hai Nguyen, own and run Studio Hill recording studio in Austin, Texas.

Early life
Kaur was born in Montclair, California (born Loan Xuan Mai) and later adopted her baptism name, Teresa Mai. She was raised in Manhattan Beach, California. "When I was 4 years old, I got a hold of a VHS copy of The Sound of Music, and that did it for me," said Kaur. She earned a Bachelor of Music degree in Opera Performance at California State University, Long Beach (Bob Cole Conservatory of Music), and a Masters of Music in Vocal Performance from the Boston Conservatory at Berklee.

Career
Sangeeta Kaur is a singer, composer, multi-media performing artist, and producer whose genres are classified as classical crossover and new age music. In 2022 Kaur was awarded a Grammy Award for Best Classical Solo Vocal Album for Mythologies.

She has released six studio albums: Yoga is Love (2012), Niguma (2016), Ascension, Niguma Vol. 2 (2017), which was also the music for her mantra opera, Niguma: The Mantra Project, which premiered at the Broad Stage in Santa Monica, CA. Her later releases include Mirrors (2018) and Compassion (2019) created with the Budapest Studio Orchestra, the Budapest Studio Choir, & Sterling Ensemble. In 2020, she released Illuminance,  produced by Grammy Award-winning composer and pianist Peter Kater and co-produced by Kaur which debuted at # 1 on Amazon's Hot New Releases chart.

Kaur was classically trained as an operatic vocalist, who while performing internationally, was introduced to the world of spiritual mantra as well as the practice of Kundalini Yoga.  When asked about her new age music career in an interview, "It was opera all the way — no Broadway, no contemporary — and if you sang outside of opera, you were bad," said Kaur. "But after I went to New York City for auditions, I began to study yoga and spirituality deeply. And this started me to shift my entire perspective as to what my purpose was in life … my calling was to bring joy and healing to everyone through my music".

Kaur has performed internationally including the Sydney Opera House, the Lincoln Center, Segerstrom Center for the Arts, SXSW, and the Melbourne Recital Centre.  In May 2021, she performed as part of PBS's Front & Center music series, (Sangeeta Kaur and Friends), performing with Jon Anderson of Yes and Jake Shimabukuro.

As the creator and producer of the musical production, Niguma, The Mantra Project, Kaur performed the ancient story based on the 11th century yogini by the name of Lady Niguma, told through songs from her previous two albums, modern classical dance, yoga and visual arts. Niguma, The Mantra Project, premiered at The Broad Stage, in Santa Monica, California on November 5, 2016.

In 2022 at the South by Southwest music festival, Kaur and her production company, Studio Hill Productions, partnered with Wisdome LA, Los Angeles’ largest immersive art and music dome park, to produce a replica, Wisdome 360 Immersive Dome Park, in downtown Austin, Texas.

Spirituality and Yoga
Kaur began her spiritual journey while living in New York.  She met her spiritual teachers who then guided her toward her practice and studies in Tibetan Buddhism, Kundalini Yoga, Yoga of Lady Niguma and the Yoga of Sound and Mantra.  She released her first Mantra album Yoga is Love in 2012 and collaborated on several other albums with teachers and artists Amanbir Singh and Sajah Singh. She is a featured artist on Ra Ma Record's first compilation album that was released in 2013. Kaur changed her name from Teresa Mai to Sangeeta Kaur,  (which means Princess of Music and Harmony), at her yogi's suggestion.

Social contributions
Kaur is the founder of the non-profit organization Empower With Art Productions, which recognizes up-and-coming talent in music, dance, and visual arts. EWAP produces professional level productions for artists to gain experience and showcase their gifts and talents.

Kaur is active in the Vietnamese community. In addition to writing and producing her own body of music, she has performed in many Vietnamese productions such as, Paris By Night, by Thuy Nga Productions, and ASIA Productions, the non-profit Pearl of the Heart Productions which supports Vietnamese International artists and disabled artists. She is also a resident singer for the Vietnamese American Philharmonics non-profit under its director, Khanh Hong Nguyen.

Kaur is an international Kundalini Yoga teacher, mantra artist, and in 2016 founded Sat Nam Yoga, a community based yoga studio in Little Saigon (Westminster, California), for Vietnamese students to attend for donations and at no charge to those who could not afford it. She closed the studio in 2020 due to the COVID-19 pandemic.

Personal life
Kaur is married to singer and classical guitarist Hai Nguyen.  Kaur and Hai now split their time between Marina Del Rey, California and Austin, Texas, where they own and run, Studio Hill, recording studio.

Discography
 2012 - Yoga is Love
 2016 - Niguma
 2017 - Ascension, Niguma VOL. 2: The Mantra Project
 2018 - Mirrors
 2019 - Compassion
 2020 - Illuminance

Awards
{|class="wikitable sortable"
!Year
!Nominated Work
!Category
!Award
!Result
|-
| 2022 || Mythologies || Classical Solo Vocal Album || Grammy Award|| 
|-
| 2021 || Worlds Collide || Best Pangea || InterContinental Music Awards|| 
|-
| 2020 || Illuminance || Best Female Vocalist || Global Music Awards || 
|-
| 2020 || Compassion|| Best New Age Album || Independent Music Award ||  
|-
| 2020 || Sangeeta Kuar Honored || Inductee Indie Music "Hall of Fame" || Indie Music Channel ||  
|-
| 2020 || Illuminance || Best Vocal Album ||Zone Music Award || 
|-
| 2020 || Compassion || Album of the Year || Zone Music Awards||  
|-
| 2019 || Compassion|| Best Classical Artist|| Radio Music Award||  
|-
| 2019 || Rise Up || Best New Age Song|| Radio Music Award||  
|-
| 2019 || May the Long Time Sun  || Best New Age Artist|| Radio Music Awards || 
|-
| 2019 || Rise Up|| Best New Age Song || Hollywood Media in Music Award ||  
|-
| 2019 || Ardas Bhaee || Outstanding Music Video || Producers Choice Honors|| 
|-
| 2019 || Compassion || Best Female Classical Artist ||Indie Music Channel||  
|-
| 2019 || Mirrors || Best New Female Artist of the Year || Indie Music Channel||  
|-
| 2019 || Mother Earth|| Best New Age Song|| Indie Music Channel||  
|-
| 2019 || I'm Not Gonna Break || Best New Age Video || Indie Music Channel || 
|-
| 2017 || Ascension – Niguma Volume 2/The Mantra Project'  || Winner || Global Peace Song Award || 
|-
| 2016 || Niguma|| Grand Prize || Peace Song Award  ||  
|-
| 2016 || Ardas Bhaee || Best Music Video|| Peace Song Award "||  
|-
| 2016|| Let Me Weep'' || Best Classical / Opera Song ||Peace Song Award"||

See also 
 Asian Americans in arts and entertainment
 List of Grammy Award winners and nominees by country

References

Living people
American people of Vietnamese descent
21st-century Vietnamese women singers
21st-century American women singers
21st-century American singers
Year of birth missing (living people)